Anthene madibirensis is a butterfly in the family Lycaenidae. It is found in Tanzania (the Madibira district).

References

Butterflies described in 1921
Anthene
Endemic fauna of Tanzania
Butterflies of Africa